Personal prelature is a canonical structure of the Catholic Church which comprises a prelate, clergy and laity who undertake specific pastoral activities. The first personal prelature is Opus Dei. Personal prelatures, similar to dioceses and military ordinariates, are under the governance of the Vatican's Congregation for Bishops. On 4 August 2022, personal prelatures will be instead governed under the Dicastery for the Clergy. These three types of ecclesiastical structures are composed of lay people served by their own secular clergy and prelate. Unlike dioceses, which cover territories, personal prelatures—like military ordinariates—take charge of persons as regards some objectives regardless of where they live.

Origins 

In the Catholic Church, the personal prelature was conceived during the sessions of the Second Vatican Council in no. 10 of the decree Presbyterorum ordinis and was later enacted into law by Paul VI in his motu proprio Ecclesiae sanctae. The institution was later reaffirmed in the 1983 Code of Canon Law.

Nature

A personal prelature is an institution having clergy and lay members which carry out specific pastoral activities. "Both [clergy and laity] belong equally to the prelature, in which, as in the whole Church and in any of its parts, there is fundamental equality among all the faithful in terms of their dignity and mission as Christians, and at the same time there is an essential diversity as far as the priesthood is concerned," states the website Prelaturas Personales. "This diversity is at the foundation of the organic cooperation between priests and laity in the same mission of the Church. John Paul II, speaking about the Prelature of Opus Dei, affirmed: 'First of all, I wish to emphasize that the membership of the lay faithful in their own particular Churches and in the Prelature, into which they are incorporated, enables the special mission of the Prelature to converge with the evangelizing efforts of each particular Church, as envisaged by the Second Vatican Council in desiring the figure of personal prelatures.' (Discourse, October 17, 2001). Conceiving the prelature as an institution formed only by priests would contradict the very novelty and specific nature of the prelatures. This conception would see the prelatures as associations of priests incardinated in them, certainly very important institutions in the life of the Church, but essentially different in their associative and only clerical nature." 

The adjective personal refers to the fact that, in contrast with previous canonical use for ecclesiastical institutions, the jurisdiction of the prelate is not linked to a territory but over persons wherever they happen to be. The establishment of personal prelatures is an exercise of the theologically inherent power of self-organization which the Church has to pursue its mission, though a personal prelature is not a particular church as dioceses and eparchies are.

Structure
A personal prelature is an ordinary jurisdictional structure of the Catholic Church. The prelate is a bishop or a presbyter nominated by the Pope and governs the prelature with ordinary power. The presbyterium of the prelature is formed by presbyters and deacons of the secular clergy, that are incardinated in the personal prelature (can. 294). However, it is possible that other priests and also religious clergy take part in the pastoral works of a personal prelature: in these cases, agreements should be arranged between the prelate and the diocesan bishop (can. 271) or the religious superior (can. 681)

The prelate has the right to erect a national or international seminary, and to promote students to holy orders, in service to the pastoral mission of the prelature (can. 295).

The lay faithful of a prelature are determined by a personal criteria, which is established in each case by the Apostolic See, in the constitutional documents of the prelature, or in its statutes. Diverse organizational models are possible, according to a variety of possible missions: for example, the determination a iure of those lay faithful for whom the pastoral mission is intended, or the express inscription in an apposite register, as is the case in other personal ecclesiastical circumscriptions. It is also possible that, through a mutual agreement or convention, lay faithful can pursue the specific mission of the prelature in organic cooperation with the prelate and his presbyterium, by the terms established in its statutes (can. 296). The fact that these lay persons are under the jurisdiction of the prelate does not impede their being under the authority of the diocesan bishop or pertaining to other ecclesiastical jurisdictions (accumulative jurisdiction).

The statutes likewise are to define the relations of the personal prelature with the diocesan bishops in whose dioceses the prelature exercises its pastoral or missionary works (can. 297).

Application

Opus Dei
The first, and thus far the only, personal prelature is Opus Dei, which was established as a personal prelature by Pope John Paul II in 1982 through the Apostolic constitution Ut sit. In the case of Opus Dei, the prelate is elected by members of the prelature and confirmed by the Pope.

According to John Paul II, the priests and lay faithful (both men and women) are "the components by which the Prelature is organically structured," and that the lay faithful are members of their dioceses and of the prelature, enabling them to work apostolically in their ordinary circumstances. He also mentioned that Opus Dei has a hierarchical structure. This he expressed in 2002 to members of the Prelature of Opus Dei, both laity and priests:

Other possible personal prelatures

The website prelaturaspersonales.org states that other personal prelatures can be established for emigrants and social minorities.

Philippine clergy proposes personal prelatures for the pastoral care of Filipino migrants. This canonical set-up can help the Filipino migrants integrate better into their local church and help spread best practices in integration from other places where Filipinos have migrated. A prelature rather than an ordinariate can better serve the purpose since it will not have to provide all the pastoral services and the migrants will continue to be faithful of their specific dioceses. 

The Society of Pope Pius X has been offered a canonical restructuring as a personal prelature by Rome.

Related structures: personal ordinariate and apostolic administration 
On October 20, 2009, it was announced that the Holy See would create personal ordinariates for Anglicans entering the Catholic Church, a formula inspired by existing military ordinariates, in ways that are comparable to the current Opus Dei personal prelature. A major difference between an ordinariate and a prelature is the ordinariates (both personal and military) may erect parishes and those who inscribe themselves in the apposite register effectively become transients in their geographic diocese (no accumulative membership). The personal ordinariates for former Anglicans were also authorized to use a unique liturgy developed by the CDF and CDW.
Three are established: Our Lady of the Southern Cross for Australia and Japan, Our Lady of Walsingham for England and Wales, The Chair of Saint Peter for USA and Canada.

Another, unique prelature is the Personal Apostolic Administration of Saint John Mary Vianney in Brazil, for the Tridentine Use.

See also

 Territorial prelate

Footnotes

External links 
Prelaturas Personales
 Canonical texts on personal prelatures
 How do personal prelatures resemble and how do they differ from dioceses, religious orders and movements?
 What is a personal prelature?
 Spanish texts and video
 Itinerario Juridico del Opus Dei
 Preguntas frequentes

Catholic canonical structures